Sir Richard Neil Posnett  (19 July 1919 – 11 May 2009) was a British colonial administrator who served as Governor of Belize (from 1972 to 1976) and Governor of Bermuda (from 1981 to 1983). He was also briefly Commissioner of Anguilla (in 1969) and High Commissioner of the United Kingdom to Uganda (in 1979). Posnett was a founder of the Uganda Olympic Committee and a fluent speaker of Swahili.

Notes

References

1919 births
2009 deaths
Alumni of St John's College, Cambridge
Companions of the Order of St Michael and St George
Governors of Anguilla
Governors of Bermuda
Governors of British Honduras
High Commissioners of the United Kingdom to Uganda
Knights Commander of the Order of the British Empire
People educated at Kingswood School, Bath
People from Nilgiris district
Uganda at the Olympics
Ugandan civil servants